This is a list of mayors of Muncie, Indiana.

Mayors

References

Muncie